The ACC Men's Challenger Cup is One Day International and Limited-overs (50 overs) international cricket tournament run by the Asian Cricket Council and contested in a league system.This is a part of the qualification pathway towards the ACC Men's Premier Cup and the Asia Cup.

On 9 February 2023, the ACC announced the schedule of the inaugural tournament, with 8 teams took part (the host Thailand, Bahrain, Bhutan, Saudi Arabia, Indonesia, Maldives, Iran and Myanmar).

Results

See also
ACC Twenty20 Cup
ACC Championship
ACC Trophy

References 

Asia Cup
International cricket competitions in 2023
International cricket competitions in Thailand